Sultan Abdul Aziz Shah Airport Road/Sultan Abdul Aziz Shah Airport Highway or Federal Route 15 is a major highway in Selangor, Malaysia.

List of interchanges

Gallery

References

Highways in Malaysia
Expressways and highways in the Klang Valley